Errol Thurton (born 1944) is a Belizean sprinter. He competed in the men's 400 metres at the 1976 Summer Olympics.

References

External links
 

1944 births
Living people
Athletes (track and field) at the 1976 Summer Olympics
Belizean male sprinters
Olympic athletes of Belize
Place of birth missing (living people)